White Summer•Black Winter is the third album by the American stoner/doom metal band Serpent Throne.

Track listing
CD version
  "Headed For an Unmarked Grave"
  "White Summer•Black Winter"
  "Controlled By Lunar Forces"
  "March of the Druids"
  "Riff Forest"
  "Pagan Eclipse"
  "Four Winds"
  "Mushroom Cloud"
  "Last Spark of the Sun"

LP version
Side A
  "Headed For an Unmarked Grave"
  "White Summer•Black Winter"
  "Controlled By Lunar Forces"
  "March of the Druids"

Side B
  "Riff Forest"
  "Four Winds"
  "Mushroom Cloud"
  "Pagan Eclipse"

2010 albums
Serpent Throne albums